Tinicum Park is a  park in Bucks County, Pennsylvania. It is located on River Road (PA 32) in Erwinna, Pennsylvania. There is a Polo club that plays in the summer.

External links
Map
Timicum park on Bucks County.org

Parks in Bucks County, Pennsylvania